Bruno Coqueran (born 19 June 1970 in Créteil, France) is a French basketball player who played 19 matches for the French men's national basketball team from 1993–1994.

References

French men's basketball players
1970 births
Living people
ASVEL Basket players
Besançon BCD players
Cholet Basket players
Le Mans Sarthe Basket players
SIG Basket players
Power forwards (basketball)